Tylophorella is a genus of lichen-forming fungi in the order Arthoniales. The genus has not been placed into a family. Tylophorella was circumscribed by Finnish lichenologist Edvard August Vainio in 1890, with Tylophorella polyspora assigned as the type species. T. pyrenocarpoides (a species originally described as Opegrapha pyrenocarpoides by Johannes Müller Argoviensis in 1880) was added to the genus in 1993.

Species
Tylophorella polyspora 
Tylophorella pyrenocarpoides

References

Arthoniomycetes
Arthoniomycetes genera
Lichen genera
Taxa named by Edvard August Vainio
Taxa described in 1890